The 25K run (25 kilometers, approximately 15.52 miles) is a long distance running footrace that is between the distance of a half marathon and a marathon. It was formerly an official world record distance in road running by World Athletics, but has since been downgraded to world best status. Separately, the Association of Road Racing Statisticians retains world records in the 25K distance. The ARRS holds different standards for records than World Athletics, with exclusions for certain point-to-point races and mixed sex races. As a result its women's world record is 1:26:34 by Nancy Conz, set in 1982.

The distance was more common in the mid-20th century as mass road running was beginning to develop, but began declining with the increased popularity and familiarity of the marathon and half marathon distance. Some former 25K races have transitioned to shorter distances, with which runners and sponsors are more familiar. In particular, the establishment of the World Athletics Half Marathon Championships in 1992 proved a driver for private races and national championships to switch to the half marathon as the most common distance between the 10K run and the marathon.

However, as trail running and ultra running continue to find larger participant fields, the 25K has become a more common trail race distance (many trail races and ultra races use the metric system). As runners prepare for a 100K run, they may do training race steps with a 25K followed by a 50K.

Competitions
In international competition, the distance has rarely been used. The World Masters Non-Stadia Athletics Championships hosted men's and women's 25K races from 1992 to 1996 and the European Masters Athletics Championships Non Stadia featured men's and women's 25K races in 1991. Official national championships have been staged by the United States beginning 1933 for men and 1982 for women. German-speaking European countries also held national championship races, including Austria, Switzerland, and Germany (both East, West and Unified). All of these were replaced by national half marathon championships, following the decision to host a world championship at that distance from 1992 onwards.
Separately, Czechoslovakia also held several national 25K races in the mid-20th century.

Many of the longest running 25K races have taken place in the United States. The annual Around Cape Ann 25K in Gloucester, Massachusetts was established in 1933 as a 15-mile race (24.1 km) and has been held at the 25K distance from at least 1976. The River Bank Run, established 1978 in Grand Rapids, Michigan, is the most significant race in the nation at this distance and has hosted an official USATF national championship race every year since 1995. Other races include the Youngstown International Peace Race, which was held from 1975 to 1988, and the City of Lakes race (now a half marathon) which had a 25K race from 1982 to 2013.

Germany has also hosted multiple mass races at this distance. The BIG 25 Berlin, founded in 1980, is among the most significant privately-organised races over the distance, with the current men's world record being set at this competition in 2012. Elsewhere in Germany, the Griesheimer Straßenlauf was created in 1972 as an annual 25K, before converting to a half marathon in 1993. The Paderborner Osterlauf, also now a half marathon, was held over 25K from 1961 to 1992.

Elsewhere in Europe, in Helsinki, Finland the Kaisaniemen Juoksu 25K run was established in 1929 and was converted to a standard half marathon in 2012. The Brněnská 25 in the Czech Republic has been running since 1967, and the country's Beh Kolem Hluboke race has been held on over 75 occasions. In England, the Mitcham 25K was originally a 15-mile race, then converted to a 25K from 1968 to 2001, while the Chichester-Portsmouth course from 1932 to 1986 was roughly 25K. In Hungary the Pécs-Harkány 25K had been held annually since at least 2000.

The Stella Royal 25K has been held annually in Durban, South Africa since 1975.

In India, the AIMS-certified Tata Steel Kolkata 25K has been labeled a silver-labeled race by the IAAF. The race has been taking place since at least 2014, but has gain higher status in the late 2010s as greater prize purses were given and faster times were run. Nearly 15,000 runners participate in the event weekend, which includes the 25K and a 10K. The course records were set in 2019 by Leonard Barsoton (1:13:05) and Guteni Shone (1:22:09).

All-time top
+ = en route to longer performance
Mx = mixed gender race
Wo = women only race

Men

Women

References

 
Road running distances
Long-distance running distances